These are the results of the Women's 400 metres hurdles event at the 1997 World Championships in Athletics in Athens, Greece.

Medalists

Results

Heats
First 3 of each Heat (Q) and the next 4 fastest (q) qualified for the semifinals.

Semifinals
First 4 of each Semifinal qualified directly (Q) for the final.

Final

References
 Results
 IAAF

H
400 metres hurdles at the World Athletics Championships
1997 in women's athletics